The Women's time trial at the 2012 UCI Track Cycling World Championships was held on April 8. 23 athletes participated in the contest.

Medalists

Results
The race was held at 19:30.

References

2012 UCI Track Cycling World Championships
UCI Track Cycling World Championships – Women's 500 m time trial